The 2022 South Australian state election was held on 19 March 2022 to elect members to the 55th Parliament of South Australia. All 47 seats in the House of Assembly (the lower house, whose members were elected at the 2018 election), and half the seats in the Legislative Council (the upper house, last filled at the 2014 election) were up for re-election.

The one-term incumbent minority Liberal government, led by Premier Steven Marshall, was defeated by the opposition Labor Party, led by Opposition Leader Peter Malinauskas, in a landslide. Marshall conceded to Malinauskas about three hours after the polls closed. It is the first time since 1982, and only the fourth time since 1933, that a sitting government in South Australia has been defeated after a single term.

Labor won 27 seats in the lower house, while the Liberals retained 16 seats—with the remaining four seats won by independents. The new ministry was sworn in two days after the election, and Malinauskas became the state's 47th Premier.

In the 22-seat upper house where 11 seats were up for election, the result was five Labor, four Liberal, one Green, and one One Nation, for a total of nine Labor government seats, eight Liberal opposition seats, with five crossbenchers—two Green, two SA-Best, and one One Nation. Consequently, the new Labor government would require an additional three non-government votes to pass legislation; however, the Liberal upper house President was unexpectedly re-elected to the Presidency, which gave the Labor government nine of 21 seats during votes on the floor, meaning that only an additional two non-government votes are required to pass legislation.

Like federal elections, South Australia has compulsory voting, uses full-preference instant-runoff voting for single-member electorates in the lower house, and optional preference single transferable voting in the proportionally represented upper house. The election was conducted by the Electoral Commission of South Australia (ECSA), an independent body answerable to Parliament.

Results

House of Assembly

Seats changing hands

Pendulum

Legislative Council

The final result was 5 Labor, 4 Liberal, 1 Green, and 1 One Nation, for a total of 9 Labor government seats, 8 Liberal opposition seats, with 5 crossbenchers — 2 Green, 2 SA-Best, and 1 One Nation.

With the Liberal upper house President unexpectedly re-elected to the Presidency, this gives the Labor government nine of 21 seats during votes on the floor, meaning that only an additional two non-government votes are required to pass legislation.

Background

House of Assembly

In the House of Assembly at the 2018 election, the Liberal opposition formed a two-seat majority government with 25 of 47 seats. The former 16-year four-term Labor government went in to opposition with 19 seats. The crossbench was represented by 3 independents: Frances Bedford, Troy Bell and Geoff Brock. The Liberals won 51.9% of the statewide two-party-preferred vote, which was actually a slight swing toward Labor.

Government loses its majority (2021)
The Liberal Party's already slender majority was further reduced when in, February 2020, Sam Duluk, the member for Waite, had his Liberal membership suspended due to his personal conduct at a 2019 Christmas party, which led to him being charged with assault by police. Duluk was found not guilty in the Adelaide Magistrates Court in August 2021, though he remained on the crossbench as an independent.

In February 2021, Fraser Ellis, the Liberal member for Narungga, was charged by the Independent Commissioner Against Corruption (ICAC) with 23 counts of deception, relating to 78 fraudulent claims over the alleged misuse of a travel allowance totalling more than $18,000. The ICAC charges led to Ellis resigning from the Liberal Party and moving to the crossbench as an independent, which officially transitioned the Liberals into a minority government. Later that year, Dan Cregan, the Liberal member for Kavel, resigned from the party to sit as an independent, citing the government's failure to manage population growth in the Adelaide Hills. Several days after his resignation from the party, Cregan was elected as Speaker of the House of Assembly after a ballot, as the government's preferred candidate lacked sufficient support in the Assembly.

Though in minority, the government did not fall, as it never lost a vote on confidence or supply; in any event, Ellis and other independents had stated they would support the Marshall government on such matters.

Legislative Council

After the 2018 election, the numbers in the Legislative Council were 8 Liberal, 8 Labor, 2 SA Best, 2 Greens, 1 Conservative and 1 Advance SA. Conservative MLC Dennis Hood, who had been elected as a Family First MLC in 2014, defected to the Liberals nine days after the 2018 state election. In 2020, John Dawkins was expelled from the Liberal Party for breaking party rules by nominating himself for President of the Legislative Council. The 22 seat upper house composition before the 2022 election was therefore 8 Liberal, 8 Labor, 2 SA Best, 2 Greens, 1 Advance SA, and 1 independent.

Of these members: 4 Liberal, 4 Labor, 2 SA Best and 1 Green have terms which continue until 2026; and 4 Liberal, 4 Labor, 1 Green, 1 Advance SA and 1 independent were up for re-election in 2022, though the independent Dawkins did not contest the election.

Campaign

Labor campaigned extensively on improving the state's healthcare infrastructure,  pledging to increase the amount of ambulances, hospital beds, nurses and doctors in order to combat long-standing overcrowding of hospitals and ramping of ambulances, which Labor stated to have greatly intensified during Marshall's Liberal administration. To this end, Labor promised to cancel the construction of a basketball stadium for which $662 million had been budgeted in the previous state budget, and reallocate the basketball stadium funds to their healthcare plan.

As part of an effort to secure the electoral district of Kavel, Labor also promised to build a new hospital in Mount Barker. The MP for Kavel, Dan Cregan, had resigned from the Liberals in October 2021 to become an independent, citing insufficient government investment in the district; among Cregan's demands included the construction of a new hospital.

The Australian Christian Lobby campaigned for SA election candidates who opposed late-term abortions and who promote more socially conservative policies.

Pauline Hanson's One Nation ran in its first South Australian election since 2006. The newly formed Family First Party (which is different from the previous Family First Party), the Australian Family Party and Sustainable Australia ran for the first time as well.

Candidates

Registered parties

Parties registered with the Electoral Commission of South Australia.

 Liberal Party of Australia (South Australian Division)
 Australian Labor Party (SA Branch)
 Greens South Australia
 SA-BEST
 Advance SA
 National Party of Australia (SA)
 Child Protection Party
 Animal Justice Party

 Pauline Hanson's One Nation
 Australian Family Party
 Family First Party Inc
 Real Change SA
 Legalise Cannabis South Australia Party
 Liberal Democratic Party
 SA Party – Stop Overdevelopment & Corruption

Polling

Preferred premier and satisfaction polling

Redistribution and pre-redistribution pendulum

To produce "fair" electoral boundaries, the Electoral Commission of South Australia (ECSA) has been required following the1989 election to redraw boundaries after each election through a "fairness clause" in the state constitution, with the objective that the party which receives over 50 percent of the statewide two-party vote at the forthcoming election should win the two-party vote in a majority of seats in terms of the two-party-preferred vote calculated in all seats regardless of any differing two-candidate-preferred vote. As it was interpreted from 1991 to 2016, the Electoral Districts Boundaries Commission (EDBC) drew boundaries to try and ensure that the party winning the majority of the state-wide two-party preferred vote would also win a majority of the seats in the House of Assembly; however, the Weatherill government repealed the fairness provision in 2017 so that it was no longer the second criteria for redistributions after equality.

Yet the 2020 redistribution showed that the fairness criteria has not been removed from South Australian redistributions. The EDBC ruled that it could still consider fairness under a general provision that permits the Commission to "have regard to any other matters it thinks relevant". Having been legislatively required in the past, fairness will continue to be allowed as a matter for consideration in the future.

The Electoral Districts Boundaries Commission released a new draft redistribution in August 2020, as calculated from the 27 Liberal−20 Labor seat count by two-party vote as recorded in all 47 seats at the 2014 state election. The net change proposed retained a 27 Liberal−20 Labor notional seat count on a TPP basis when not considering elected independents.

The pendulum below shows the post-redistribution margins, in percentage points, calculated by ABC’s Antony Green, taking into account seats held by independents who are contesting their current seats at the next election, which differ somewhat to the margins calculated by the South Australian Electoral Districts Boundaries Commission that does not take into account currently elected independents. The EDBC is the only redistribution authority in Australia that is required to examine voting patterns in drawing electoral boundaries, and in doing so, assume that the proportion of each party's vote in the declaration vote (postal, pre-poll and absent votes) is evenly distributed across the whole of each former electorate. Antony Green's margin estimates are more accurately calculated using declaration votes from the redistributed polling booths.

Retiring members are shown in italic text.

Retiring MPs

Liberal 

 Stephan Knoll MHA (Schubert) – announced 1 December 2020
 Peter Treloar MHA (Flinders) – announced 1 December 2020
 Rob Lucas MLC – announced 20 March 2018

Labor
 Jon Gee MHA (Taylor) – announced 27 January 2021

Independent
 John Dawkins MLC – elected as Liberal, announced 3 February 2020

Date

The last state election was held on 17 March 2018 to elect members for the House of Assembly and half of the members in the Legislative Council. In South Australia, section 28 of the Constitution Act 1934, as amended in 2001, directs that parliaments have fixed four-year terms, and elections must be held on the third Saturday in March every four years unless this date falls the day after Good Friday, occurs within the same month as a Commonwealth election, or the conduct of the election could be adversely affected by a state disaster. Section 28 also states that the Governor may also dissolve the Assembly and call an election for an earlier date if the government has lost the confidence of the Assembly or a bill of special importance has been rejected by the Legislative Council. Section 41 states that both the Council and the Assembly may also be dissolved simultaneously if a deadlock occurs between them. As none of these possibilities eventuated, the election was held on its proper date of 19 March 2022.

The Electoral (Miscellaneous) Amendment Act 2013 introduced set dates for writs for general elections in South Australia. The writ sets the dates for the close of the electoral roll and the close of nominations for an election. The Electoral Act 1985 requires that, for a general election, the writ be issued 28 days before the date fixed for polling (S47(2a)) and the electoral roll be closed at 12 noon, 6 days after the issue of the writ (S48(3(a)(i). The close of nominations will be at 12 noon 3 days after the close of rolls (Electoral Act 1985 S48(4)(a) and S4(1)).

Aftermath and reactions
ABC News election analyst Antony Green projected that Labor would win a majority at 8:06 PM ACST on 19 March 2022, two hours after the polls closed. This defied a number of suggestions of a hung parliament. Marshall conceded defeat to Malinauskas an hour later.

Labor took seven seats off the Liberals, including two seats that had never been held by Labor before this election, Davenport and Waite. Davenport had been in the hands of the Liberals and their predecessors, the Liberal and Country League, since its creation in 1970. Waite and its predecessor seat, Mitcham, had been held by non-Labor parties or conservative independents since the introduction of single-member seats in 1938. Additionally, the Liberals suffered large swings in previously safe seats such as Bragg, Morphett, and Hammond.

The Liberals were reduced to their smallest presence in the lower house since 2006 This came mainly due to losing many of the gains they had made in Adelaide four years earlier. The Liberals had won power in 2018 mainly on the strength of winning 16 of Adelaide's 33 seats, their best showing since taking all but nine of the capital's seats in their 1993 landslide. In 2022, all seven of their losses to Labor were in metropolitan seats. Labor had spent all but 16 years since the end of the Playmander in government due to its traditional dominance of Adelaide. South Australia is one of the most centralised states in Australia; Adelaide is home to over three-quarters of the state's population.

To a greater extent than other state capitals, Adelaide is decisive in deciding state election outcomes. Since the end of the Playmander and the introduction of one vote one value legislation in 1975, most elections have seen Labor win most of the metropolitan seats, with most of the Liberal vote locked up in safe rural seats. Even when the Liberals won majorities of the two-party preferred vote in 1989, 2002, 2010 and 2014, Labor clung to or won government because most of the Liberal majority was wasted on massive landslides in their rural heartland.

The 2022 election saw more of the same. All three of the Liberals' safe seats (>10 percent 2PP) were rural, while all but four of their non-safe seats (<10 percent 2PP) and all but three of their marginal seats (<7 percent 2PP) were urban. One of those marginal seats belonged to Marshall, who was nearly defeated in his own seat of Dunstan after suffering a swing of almost seven percent.

On 20 March 2022, Marshall announced he would resign as leader of the Liberals at a later date, but intended to remain the member for Dunstan.

On 21 March 2022 Malinauskas was formally sworn as Premier by the Governor of South Australia, with Susan Close as his deputy.

In April 2022, it was "formally confirmed" at by the end of April that a One Nation member won a seat within the South Australia legislative council (upper house) making history.

See also
 2018 South Australian state election
 Members of the South Australian House of Assembly, 2018–2022
 Members of the South Australian Legislative Council, 2018–2022
 Malinauskas ministry

References

2022 elections in Australia
2020s in South Australia
Elections in South Australia
March 2022 events in Australia